Reuben Garrett Lucius Goldberg (July 4, 1883 – December 7, 1970), known best as Rube Goldberg, was an American cartoonist, sculptor, author, engineer, and inventor.

Goldberg is best known for his popular cartoons depicting complicated gadgets performing simple tasks in indirect, convoluted ways. The cartoons led to the expression "Rube Goldberg machines" to describe similar gadgets and processes. Goldberg received many honors in his lifetime, including a Pulitzer Prize   for political cartooning in 1948, the National Cartoonists Society's Gold T-Square Award in 1955, and the Banshees' Silver Lady Award in 1959.  He was a founding member and first president of the National Cartoonists Society, which hosts the annual Reuben Award, honoring the top cartoonist of the year and named after Goldberg, who won the award in 1967. He is the inspiration for international competitions known as Rube Goldberg Machine Contests, which challenge participants to create a complicated machine to perform a simple task.

Personal life
Goldberg was born on July 4, 1883 in San Francisco, California, to Jewish parents Max and Hannah (Cohn) Goldberg. He was the third of seven children, three of whom died as children; older brother Garrett, younger brother Walter, and younger sister Lillian also survived. Goldberg began tracing illustrations when he was four years old, and took his only drawing lessons with a local sign painter.

In 1911, the R. L. Goldberg Building at 182–198 Gough Street, San Francisco was constructed for his widowed father to live in, as well as to collect rental income. 

Goldberg married Irma Seeman on 17 October 1916. They lived at 98 Central Park West in New York City and had sons Thomas and George. During World War II, as each of his sons were heading off to college, Goldberg insisted that they change their surname because of antisemitic sentiment towards him stemming from the political nature of his cartoons. Thomas chose the surname of George, and his brother, also named George, followed suit. In adopting the same surname, George wanted to keep a sense of family cohesiveness.

Career

Goldberg's father was a San Francisco police and fire commissioner, who encouraged the young Reuben to pursue a career in engineering. Rube graduated from the University of California, Berkeley in 1904 with a degree in Engineering and was hired by the city of San Francisco as an engineer for the Water and Sewers Department. After six months he resigned his position with the city to join the San Francisco Chronicle where he became a sports cartoonist. The following year, he took a job with the San Francisco Bulletin, where he remained until he moved to New York City in 1907, finding employment as a sports cartoonist with the New York Evening Mail.

Goldberg's first public hit was a comic strip called Foolish Questions, beginning in 1908. The invention cartoons began in 1912. The New York Evening Mail was syndicated to the first newspaper syndicate, the McClure Newspaper Syndicate, giving Goldberg's cartoons a wider distribution, and by 1915 he was earning $25,000 per year and being billed by the paper as America's most popular cartoonist. Rather than lose Goldberg to Hearst, the New York Evening Mail matched the salary offer and formed the Evening Mail Syndicate to syndicate Goldberg's cartoons nationally.

In 1916, Goldberg created a series of seven short animated films which focus on humorous aspects of everyday situations in the form of an animated newsreel.  The seven films were released on these dates in 1916:  May 8, The Boob Weekly; May 22, Leap Year; June 5, The Fatal Pie; Jun 19, From Kitchen Mechanic to Movie Star; July 3, Nutty News; July 17, Home Sweet Home; July 31, Losing Weight.

Goldberg was syndicated by the McNaught Syndicate from 1922 until 1934.

A prolific artist, it has been estimated that Goldberg created 50,000 cartoons during his lifetime. Some of these cartoons include Mike and Ike (They Look Alike), Boob McNutt, Foolish Questions, What Are You Kicking About, Telephonies, Lala Palooza, The Weekly Meeting of the Tuesday Women's Club, and the uncharacteristically serious soap-opera strip, Doc Wright, which ran for 10 months beginning January 29, 1933.

The cartoon series that brought him lasting fame was The Inventions of Professor Lucifer Gorgonzola Butts, A.K., which ran in Collier's Weekly from 26 January  1929 to 26 December 1931. In that series, Goldberg drew labeled schematics in the form of patent applications of the comically intricate "inventions" that would later bear his name. The character of Professor Butts was based on Rube's professor Frederick Slate at the College of Mining and Engineering at the University of California, where Rube attended from 1901 to 1903. Frederick Slate gave his engineering students the task of building a scale that could weigh the earth. The scale was called the “Barodik". To Goldberg, this exemplified a comical combination of seriousness and ridiculousness that would come to serve as an inspiration in his work.

From 1938 to 1941, Goldberg drew two weekly strips for the Register and Tribune Syndicate: Brad and Dad (1939–1941) and Side Show (1938–1941), a continuation of the invention drawings.

Starting in 1938, Goldberg worked as the editorial cartoonist for the New York Sun. He won the 1948 Pulitzer Prize for Editorial Cartooning for a cartoon entitled "Peace Today". He moved to the New York Journal-American in 1949 and worked there until his retirement in 1963. In the 1960s, Goldberg began a sculpture career, primarily creating busts.

Cultural legacy
The popularity of Goldberg's cartoons was such that the term "Goldbergian" was in use in print by 1915, and "Rube Goldberg" by 1928. "Rube Goldberg" appeared in the Random House Dictionary of the English Language in 1966 meaning "having a fantastically complicated improvised appearance", or "deviously complex and impractical." The 1915 usage of "Goldbergian" was in reference to Goldberg's early comic strip Foolish Questions, which he drew from 1909 to 1934, while later use of the terms "Goldbergian", "Rube Goldberg" and "Rube Goldberg machine" refer to the crazy inventions for which he is now best known from his strip The Inventions of Professor Lucifer Gorgonzola Butts, drawn from 1914 to 1964.

The corresponding term in the UK was, and still is, "Heath Robinson", after the English illustrator with an equal devotion to odd machinery, also portraying sequential or chain reaction elements. The Danish equivalent was the painter, author and cartoonist Robert Storm Petersen, better known under his pen name Storm P. To this day, an overly complicated and/or useless object is known as a Storm P.-machine in Denmark.

Goldberg's work was commemorated posthumously in 1995 with the inclusion of Rube Goldberg's Inventions, depicting his 1931 "Self-Operating Napkin" in the Comic Strip Classics series of U.S. postage stamps.

The Rube Goldberg Machine Contest originated in 1949 as a competition at Purdue University between two fraternities. It ran until 1956, and was revived in 1983 as a university-wide competition. In 1989 it became a national competition, with a high school division added in 1996. Devices must complete a simple task in a minimum of twenty steps and a maximum of seventy-five in the style of Goldberg. The contest is hosted nationwide by Rube Goldberg Inc., a not-for-profit 501(c)(3), founded by Rube's son George W. George, and currently managed by Rube's granddaughter, Jennifer George.

In 1998, Justice Scalia remarked in a dissent in a habeas case that "Rube Goldberg would envy the scheme the Court has created."

Film and television

Rube Goldberg wrote the first feature film for the pre-Curly Howard version of The Three Stooges called Soup to Nuts, which was released in 1930 and starred Ted Healy. The film featured his machines and included cameos of Rube himself.

In the 1962 John Wayne movie Hatari!, an invention to catch monkeys by character Pockets, played by Red Buttons, is described as a "Rube Goldberg."

In the late 1960s and early '70s, educational shows like Sesame Street, Vision On and The Electric Company routinely showed bits that involved Rube Goldberg devices, including the Rube Goldberg Alphabet Contraption, and the What Happens Next Machine.

Various other films and cartoons have included highly complicated machines that perform simple tasks. Among these are Flåklypa Grand Prix, Looney Tunes, Tom and Jerry, Wallace and Gromit, Pee-wee's Big Adventure, The Way Things Go, Edward Scissorhands, Back to the Future, Honey, I Shrunk the Kids, The Goonies, Gremlins, the Saw film series, Chitty Chitty Bang Bang, The Cat from Outer Space, Malcolm, Hotel for Dogs, the Home Alone film series, Family Guy, American Dad!, Casper, and Waiting...

In the Final Destination film series the characters often die in Rube Goldberg-esque ways. In the film The Great Mouse Detective, the villain Ratigan attempts to kill the film's heroes, Basil of Baker Street and David Q. Dawson, with a Rube Goldberg style device.
The classic video in this genre was done by the artist duo Peter Fischli & David Weiss in 1987 with their 30-minute video Der Lauf der Dinge or The Way Things Go.

Honda produced a video in 2003 called "The Cog" using many of the same principles that Fischli and Weiss had done in 1987.

In 2005, the American alternative rock/indie band The Bravery released a video for their debut single, "An Honest Mistake," which features the band performing the song in the middle of a Rube Goldberg machine.

In 1999, an episode of The X-Files was titled "The Goldberg Variation". The episode intertwined characters FBI agents Mulder and Scully, a simple apartment super, Henry Weems (Willie Garson) and an ailing young boy, Ritchie Lupone (Shia LaBeouf) in a real-life Goldberg device.

The 2010 music video "This Too Shall Pass – RGM Version" by the rock band OK Go features a machine that, after four minutes of kinetic activity, shoots the band members in the face with paint. "RGM" presumably stands for Rube Goldberg Machine.

2012 The CBS show Elementary features a machine in its opening sequence.

The 2012 Discovery Channel show Unchained Reaction pitted two teams against each other to create an elaborate Rube Goldberg machine. It was judged and executive-produced by Adam Savage and Jamie Hyneman, known for hosting the science entertainment series MythBusters.

The 2014 web series Deadbeat on Hulu features an episode titled "The Ghost in the Machine," which features the protagonist Kevin helping the ghost of Rube Goldberg complete a contraption. It will bring his grandchildren together after they make a collection of random items into a machine that ends up systematically injuring two of his grandchildren so they end up in the same hospital and finally meet.

Games
Both board games and video games have been inspired by Goldberg's creations, such as the '60s board game Mouse Trap, the 1990s series of The Incredible Machine games, and Crazy Machines. The Humongous Entertainment game Freddi Fish 2: The Case of the Haunted Schoolhouse involves searching for the missing pieces to a Rube Goldberg machine to complete the game.

In 1909 Goldberg invented the "Foolish Questions" game based on his successful cartoon by the same name. The game was published in many versions from 1909 to 1934.

Rube Works: The Official Rube Goldberg Invention Game, the first game authorized by The Heirs of Rube Goldberg, was published by Unity Games (the publishing arm of Unity Technologies) in November 2013.

See also
Chindōgu
Deathtrap (plot device)
Domino effect
Domino show
Frederick Rowland Emett
Jean Tinguely, Swiss artist who created Rube Goldberg–like sculptures
Mickey One
PythagoraSwitch

References

External links

Official Rube Goldberg website
Toonopedia entry
Smithsonian's Archives of American Art: Oral History Interview with Rube Goldberg, 1970
NCS Awards

Guide to the Rube Goldberg Papers at The Bancroft Library
 Rube Goldberg interviewed by Edward Murrow, 1959
 Rube Works: The Official Rube Goldberg Invention Game

 
1883 births
1970 deaths
American editorial cartoonists
Engineers from California
UC Berkeley College of Engineering alumni
American humorists
American male journalists
Journalists from California
Artists from New York City
Writers from San Francisco
Pulitzer Prize for Editorial Cartooning winners
Reuben Award winners
Jewish caricaturists
Jewish American artists
Jewish American journalists
Jewish engineers
Jewish humorists
Lowell High School (San Francisco) alumni
Artists from San Francisco
Articles containing video clips
Engineers from New York (state)
Members of The Lambs Club

la:Machina Rube Goldberg